Dyckia cabrerae is a plant species in the genus Dyckia. This species is endemic to Brazil.

References

cabrerae
Flora of Brazil